Nicholas Erickson (July 18, 1870 – June 21, 1931) was a Coxswain serving in the United States Navy during the Spanish–American War who received the Medal of Honor for bravery.

Biography
Erickson was born July 18, 1870, in Finland, and after entering the navy he was sent to fight in the Spanish–American War aboard the U.S.S. Marblehead as a Coxswain.

He died June 21, 1931, and was buried in Woodlawn Cemetery Bronx, New York.

Medal of Honor citation
Rank and organization: Coxswain, U.S. Navy. Born: 18 July 1870, Finland. Accredited to: New York. G.O. No.: 521, 7 July 1899.

Citation:

On board the U.S.S. Marblehead during the operation of cutting the cable leading from Cienfuegos, Cuba, 11 May 1898. Facing the heavy fire of the enemy, Erickson set an example of extraordinary bravery and coolness throughout this action.

See also

List of Medal of Honor recipients for the Spanish–American War

References

External links

1870 births
1931 deaths
United States Navy Medal of Honor recipients
United States Navy sailors
American military personnel of the Spanish–American War
Foreign-born Medal of Honor recipients
Finnish emigrants to the United States
Spanish–American War recipients of the Medal of Honor